Crambe is a genus of annual and perennial flowering plants in the family Brassicaceae, native to a variety of habitats in Europe, Turkey, southwest and central Asia and eastern Africa. They carry dense racemes of tiny white or yellow flowers on (mostly leafless) stems above the basal leaves. Crambe hispanica subsp. abyssinica, formerly known as Crambe abyssinica, is grown for the oil from the seeds that has characteristics similar to whale oil.

The word "crambe" derives, via the Latin crambe, from the Greek κράμβη, a kind of cabbage.

Crambe species are used as food plants by the larvae of the weevil Lixus canescens (Coleoptera) and some Lepidoptera species including the lime-speck pug.

Species
Currently accepted species include:

Crambe alutacea Hand.-Mazz.
Crambe arborea Webb ex Christ
Crambe armena N.Busch
Crambe cordifolia Steven
Crambe edentula Fisch. & C.A.Mey. ex Korsh.
Crambe feuilleei A.Santos ex Prina & Mart.-Laborde
Crambe filiformis Jacq.
Crambe fruticosa L.f.
Crambe gigantea (Ceballos & Ortuño) Bramwell
Crambe gomeraea Webb ex Christ
Crambe gordjagini Sprygin & Popov
Crambe grandiflora DC.
Crambe grossheimii I.I.Khalilov
Crambe hedgei I.I.Khalilov
Crambe hispanica L.
Crambe juncea M.Bieb.
Crambe kilimandscharica O.E.Schulz
Crambe koktebelica (Junge) N.Busch
Crambe kralikii Coss.
Crambe laevigata DC. ex Christ
Crambe maritima L.
Crambe microcarpa A.Santos
Crambe orientalis L.
Crambe pinnatifida W.T.Aiton
Crambe pritzelii Bolle
Crambe scaberrima Webb ex Bramwell
Crambe schugnana Korsh.
Crambe scoparia Svent.
Crambe sinuatodentata Hochst. & G.W.Schimp.
Crambe steveniana Rupr.
Crambe strigosa L'Hér.
Crambe sventenii Pett. ex Bramwell & Sunding
Crambe tamadabensis Prina & Marrero Rodr.
Crambe tatarica Sebeók
Crambe × tchalenkoae Popovich & Zernov
Crambe wildpretii Prina & Bramwell

References

External links

Brassicaceae
Brassicaceae genera